The Western Australia Police Force, colloquially WAPOL, provides police services throughout the state of Western Australia, an area of 2.5 million square kilometres, the world's largest non-federated area of jurisdiction, with a population of 2.66 million, of which 2.11 million reside in the Perth Metropolitan Region.

History

Early history
The genesis of the police was the appointment of a sheriff by Captain Stirling on 18 June 1829, as part of the proclamation of the Swan River Colony. The proclamation provided for the appointment of a sheriff having under his direction a high constable, constables, bailiffs and surveyors of highways. The sheriff still exists as an officer of the Western Australian Justice Department—no longer having jurisdiction over police or highways. The sheriff retains responsibility for enforcement of court judgments and the administration of jury service. Police continue to carry out sheriff and bailiff duties, particularly in remote country locations.

Early colonial policemen were recruited by magistrates and worked part-time. They were paid only for specific tasks, such as one shilling for serving a summons. By 1830, there were fifteen part-time constables in the state, of whom five worked in Perth.

A mounted force was established in 1834, proving unpopular with citizens on the grounds that it was not efficient and was being paid out of their taxes for duties which the military should be performing. It was involved in the "Pinjarra Massacre", in which Captain Ellis, the police superintendent, was killed together with a large number of Aboriginal people. The first full-time constable for Perth was appointed in 1840.

The Legislative Council passed a police ordinance in 1849 that outlined police powers and responsibilities. An organised police force was formally established in 1853.

Convict period
After convicts started arriving in the colony in 1849, the police acquired the duties of registering and supervising ticket-of-leave men. By 1870, after transportation had ceased, some 1,244 ticket-of-leave men had to be supervised by 146 police employees.

Applicants for police service were required to be aged under forty, literate and physically fit. Leave was difficult to obtain and officers were not to appear in public when out of uniform. Until the end of the nineteenth century, the monthly pay day was marked by a parade with band.

A Criminal Investigation Department was set up in 1873, although two detectives had been sent out from Britain in 1854. A fingerprint bureau was set up in 1902.

Discussions of female police officers were held in October 1915 but remained unfunded.  Mrs Helen Blanche Dugdale (1876–1952) and Miss Laura Ethel Chipper (1879–1978) were appointed in August 1917 to commence duties on 1 September 1917 as the first two female officers.

Organisation
The Police Headquarters is located in East Perth overlooking the Causeway, near the WACA Ground. The 1960s curved building also housed the former East Perth Lockup. and a magistrates courtroom. The structure is entered on the State Heritage Register. Recruits are trained at the Western Australian Police Academy at Joondalup. Previously, the academy was located at Maylands, in premises still used by various units including the mounted and K-9 (police dog) sections.

The command structure has the state divided into three regions and sub-divided into fourteen districts.   there were 36 metropolitan and 123 regional police stations. The highest-ranking officer is the Commissioner of Police. , the Commissioner is Col Blanch. There is an Assistant Commissioner (Professional Standards), a Deputy Commissioner (Operations), a Deputy Commissioner (Specialist Services) and an executive director. Politically, the service comes within the portfolio of the Minister for Police.

A number of specialist units have been established, including the Tactical Response Group (TRG), Dog Squad (K9), Gang Crime Squad, Crime Investigation and Intelligence Services, Water Police, Traffic Enforcement Group, Specialist Police Motorcycle Unit, Regional Operations Group, Police Air Wing, Liquor Enforcement Unit and the Gold Stealing Detection Unit.

Personnel

, some 7,272 police officers were employed, including auxiliary officers and Aboriginal liaison officers; together with about 2,291 police staff.  (Police staff includes public servants and wages employees, but not school street-crossing guards.) , females constituted 25.0% of the police officers, including three of 12 senior officers.

Police auxiliary officers
The Western Australia Police have Police Auxiliary Officers, members of staff who are employed to support WA Police officers through the admission, custody and release of detainees in the Perth Watch House and other station-based lock-ups, including the supervision and transferring of detainees to court and for medical treatment in hospitals. Other duties include managing and handling drugs and firearms, processing property and exhibits and a range of station based support tasks. They are distinguishable by their maroon epaulettes, white name patches and their uniforms display 'Auxiliary Officer' instead of 'Police'.

Police Auxiliary Officers who are tasked with protective service duties are authorised to carry a firearm and a Taser and are equipped with telescopic batons, handcuffs and Oleoresin Capsicum (OC) Spray. They have limited police powers and training lasts 12 weeks at the WA Police Academy.

Regional Operations Group
Created in 2004 the Regional Operations Group provides WAPOL with a specialist public order capability. The unit is split into three sub-units, North, Central, and South. Their main role is attendance at Out of Control Gatherings (O.O.C.G.), to assist police officers requesting backup when none is available locally, or as an immediate response to serious crime.

Regional Operations Group officers undergo intensive public-order training and typically carry extra equipment whenever they are on duty.  The group is now also issued with AR-15 style semi-automatic rifles for counter-terrorism measures.

Perth police complex
In 2013 the organisation opened a new inner-city facility at 2 Fitzgerald Street, Northbridge. Accommodating up to 500 police officers, the complex includes the Perth Police Station, the Central Metropolitan District Office, the Northbridge Magistrate's Court and a new state-of-the-art Perth Watch House. Before long, the police union complained that insufficient staff had been assigned to the new lock-up in the context of state government budget constraints.

Commissioner of police

Traditionally the Commissioner came from within the service though, in 1994 and 1999, police commissioners were head-hunted from outside WA Police ranks. In 1994, Victorian Bob Falconer APM was imported from the Victoria Police where he had been a deputy commissioner. Falconer was effective in implementing the Delta Program designed to achieve organisational and cultural change. Falconer later argued that internal measures were inadequate and that a standing crime and corruption commission was necessary to combat police corruption. In 1999 Barry Matthews, then a deputy commissioner of the New Zealand Police, was appointed and served until 2004. Matthews was, however, succeeded in June 2004 by Karl O'Callaghan APM, PhD who had been employed in the WA service since age 17 and was one of the service's first officers to achieve a PhD.
O'Callaghan retired on 14 August 2017 and was succeeded by Chris Dawson. Chris Dawson stepped down as police commissioner in July 2022 to become Governor of Western Australia. He was replaced by Col Blanch on 15 July 2022.

Ranks

Equipment and weaponry
All officers are armed when on duty. The standard firearm is the Glock 22 .40-calibre pistol. Officers also carry the X-26 Taser Electronic Control Device (ECD), often described in the media as a "less-than-lethal-force" option. Prior to the Glock transition officers were armed with a .38 Special Smith & Wesson Model 10 as well as some units using the .40 S&W Smith & Wesson Sigma.

Because of the weight of equipment carried on officers' belts, Western Australian uniformed officers are being progressively issued with equipment vests fitted with pockets to safely contain equipment including ammunition magazines for the service pistol, pepper spray, baton, handcuffs, radio and mobile phone. The vests are navy blue in colour, although a fluorescent yellow version is worn for some operations.

Further specialised equipment is utilised by the TRG, as detailed in that section below.

Vehicles

2021/22 Skoda Superb Sportline Wagon

Honours and awards

Recognition of the bravery and diligent service of Western Australia Police Force personnel is through the awarding of honours and awards. Personnel are eligible to receive awards both as a part of the Australian honours system and the internal Western Australia Police Force honours system.

Australian honours system

Western Australia Police Force personnel are eligible for awards under the Australian honours system, including:
 Australian Bravery Awards – Cross of Valour, Star of Courage, Bravery Medal, Commendation for Brave Conduct, and Group Bravery Citation.
 Australian Police Medal – for distinguished service in the office of constable.
 Police Overseas Service Medal – for service with international peace-keeping organisations and/or service following requests for assistance from foreign governments.
 Humanitarian Overseas Service Medal – for humanitarian service overseas.
 National Emergency Medal – for sustained service during specified dates in specified places in response to nationally significant emergencies within Australia.
 National Police Service Medal – for 15 years' ethical and diligent service in the office of constable.
 National Medal – for 15 years' good conduct in operational service as members of specified organisations which serve or protect the community at hazard to themselves.

Western Australia Police Force honours system
 Cross for Bravery - Awarded to Western Australia Police Force personnel for an act of most conspicuous courage whereby the person placed themselves at peril and risk of significant personal injury or death.
 Western Australia Police Star – Awarded to Western Australia Police Force personnel who are killed or seriously injured whilst carrying out their primary functions on or off duty.
 Commissioner's Medal for Excellence - Awarded to Western Australia Police Force personnel who have consistently contributed to the achievement of the goals and objectives of the Western Australia Police.
 Western Australia Police Medal - Awarded to Western Australia Police Force personnel to recognise the sustained diligent and ethical service of its personnel.
 Special Commendation - Awarded to Western Australia Police Force personnel for an act of bravery whereby the person placed themselves at risk of personal injury, the action exceeding that might reasonably be expected.
 Commendation - Awarded to Western Australia Police Force personnel for meritorious conduct and devotion to duty under stressful conditions, whilst in the execution of his or her duty.
 Commissioner's Group Citation for Conduct - Awarded to a team/unit/district for displaying a significant level of commitment, dedication and professionalism to their duty in extenuating circumstances that reflects credit upon the Western Australia Police.
 Certificate of Outstanding Performance – Awarded for consistent outstanding performance by both individuals and teams at a District/Divisional and Regional/Portfolio level.
 Certificate of Appreciation – Awarded for significant contributions by individuals or community groups who, in partnership with Western Australia Police, have provided innovative, quality police services necessary to create a safer and more secure Western Australia.

Tactical Response Group
The Tactical Response Group (TRG) is a police tactical group, a component of the Counter Terrorism and Emergency Response Command.

Since 1978, the Australian Government's National Anti-Terrorism Plan has required each state police force to maintain a specialised counter-terrorist and hostage-rescue unit.

TRG officers are trained for high-risk situations and provide support to police and other agencies. Such situations include dealing with armed offenders, attending sieges and civil-disorder incidents, protecting endangered witnesses, undertaking searches of premises, securing and escorting dangerous prisoners, heads of state, VIPs and internationally protected persons, as well as the state's counter-terrorist responsibility. Specialist positions include marksmen, bomb technicians and negotiators.

The TRG is equipped with a wide range of less-lethal devices as well as specialist firearms and equipment for 'domestic' and counter-terrorist operations. Training includes tactical roping, fieldcraft, water borne operations, paramedical courses, the use of chemical, biological and radiological equipment, self-contained breathing apparatus and various weapons systems. Specialised vehicles include 2 Lenco BearCat armoured police rescue vehicles and a forward-command vehicle for emergencies and other major events.

The TRG has in recent times also expanded its capability to respond to counter-terrorist and high-risk incidents in a maritime environment including specialist divers, swimmers and the ability to board ships and oil/gas platforms.

Police Air Wing

The Police Air Wing was formed in 1976 and provides support to frontline police, including deployment of police personnel, crime detection and prevention, search and rescue, and medical transfers.

The Police Air Wing fleet comprises:
Helicopters
 one twin-engine Eurocopter AS365 Dauphin N3 for special operations, transport and rescue;
 one twin-engine Kawasaki BK117 for general operations and backup capability
Fixed-wing
 one single-engine GippsAero GA8 Airvan
 two single-engine Pilatus PC-12
Remotely Piloted Aircraft System unit

The Police Air Wing has a primary base at Jandakot Airport, in addition to a PC-12 being based at Karratha Airport.

The Pilatus PC-12 is a single-engine turbo-prop aeroplane which can carry a maximum of eight passengers 1800 km (as far as Broome). The PC-12's primary role is to transport staff statewide, but it can be utilised for search and rescue (SAR) and disaster relief efforts. The Cessna 182 is mainly used for surveillance and patrol work and can be fitted with a Leo400 FLIR unit. It is also used for inshore and land SAR searches.

The Kawasaki BK117 is a twin-engine helicopter, which has been upgraded to B2 specification. Purchased in 1990, and known as Polair 61, the aircraft's role is police patrol, surveillance, search and rescue and officer deployment. It is fitted with a Star Safire III FLIR unit with downlink capabilities, Avalex digital recorder, Avalex moving map system, four monitors, Wulfsberg tactical radio, Nitesun searchlight and a double-lift  rescue winch. FLIR (Forward looking infrared) cameras track heat sources, such as a vehicle or human body in darkness and have a high-powered zoom video camera for daylight hours.

In September 2011, the Police Air Wing took delivery of a new Eurocopter AS365 N3 helicopter, known as Polair 62. The cost of the new helicopter has been reported at $13 million for the helicopter, plus $9 million of equipment enhancements including Forward Looking Infra-Red cameras, winches, and live surveillance with downlink capabilities to the Police Operations Centre.

In July 2020, the police force placed an order for an Airbus H145 helicopter to replace the Kawasaki BK117. In September 2021, a second order was placed for a H145 to replace the Eurocopter Dauphin.

Helicopter crash

On 8 May 1992, the police Polair One helicopter crashed while attempting to land on a sports oval for a public display in Kelmscott. The helicopter, an Aerospatiale AS355F1, was destroyed after a fire started in the engine bay following ground impact. The Bureau of Air Safety Investigation report determined "The helicopter probably entered a vortex ring state during the final approach". The pilot and crewman received minor injuries, and the two passengers serious injuries, as a result of the accident.

Newman plane crash
On 26 January 2001, four police officers died when their Cessna 310R plane crashed at night near the mining town of Newman. The plane was returning from Kiwirrkurra, on the edge of the Gibson Desert, when the aircraft's engines failed due to fuel starvation on the approach to Newman airstrip. The crash was the single biggest loss of police lives in West Australian history, and the first involving a police aircraft. The officers killed in the crash were: Senior Constable Donald Richard Everett 4600 – 49 years - Pilot of Karratha Police Airwing; Senior Constable Phillip Gavin Ruland 7877 – 32 years - Newman Police Station; First Class Constable David Adrian Dewar 9178 – 31 years - Newman Police Station; Constable Gavin Ashley Capes 10305 – 27 years - Newman Police Station. A remembrance ceremony is held each year by the people of Newman to honour this tragic event.

Aboriginal-run police station
The first Indigenous-run police station is at Warakurna, a 4-hour drive westwards from Uluru, set up some years ago and already showing some positive effects. Filmmaker Cornel Ozies, who made a documentary about the station, called Our Law and shown at the 2020 Sydney Film Festival, puts the success of the program down to four things: "respect, understanding, communication, and education". The two Noongar police officers from Perth learnt the local Ngaanyatjarra language and cultural protocols of the Ngaanyatjarra people.

Criticism

Murder of Shirley Finn, 1975 
The murder of brothel keeper Shirley Finn in her car around midnight on 23 June 1975 has long been rumoured to have resulted from a police conspiracy with political ramifications. The circumstances, including the victim's alleged appearance in the canteen bar of the police headquarters at East Perth shortly before the killing, have never been officially disclosed, despite several purported investigations and a royal commission. In 2017, incessant public unrest resulted in an inconclusive coroner's inquest into the murder which sat through 28 days of evidence and heard from some 70 witnesses. In closing the inquest, the coroner announced that there had been "incompetence" in the police investigation and that there were "too many suspects", while vital evidence had "disappeared", including the murder weapon and the victim's luxury car.

Deaths in custody

The 1987-1991 Royal Commission into Aboriginal Deaths in Custody reported on the death of John Pat at Roebourne in 1983, and commissioner Elliott Johnston, QC, was critical of the lack of any disciplinary charges against five officers implicated in the violent death of a 16-year-old Aboriginal boy—calling this "a most unsatisfactory state of affairs".

The 2002 Kennedy Royal Commission investigated the February 1988 death of 18-year-old Stephen Wardle, who died whilst in custody in the East Perth lockup. A particularly controversial aspect of the case was that 17 police witnesses declined to give evidence at the coronial inquiry "for the reason that their evidence might have had the tendency to incriminate them." The commission's report noted: "The royal commission has no authority under its terms of reference to go beyond the determination of whether or not there has been criminal or corrupt conduct by any police officer with respect to the death of Stephen Wardle. The evidence does not sustain any contention that there was corrupt or criminal conduct by any police officer or officers in relation to his death"

2002 Royal Commission into WA Police integrity
Throughout the 1990s there was widespread public concern about police activities and perceived shortcomings in internal integrity, resulting in development by the Labor parliamentary opposition of draft terms of reference for a proposed royal commission. In 2002, the Kennedy Royal commission commenced to examine aspects of the behaviour and culture of the service. It concluded in 2004, finding that

...the full range of corrupt or criminal conduct from stealing to assaults, perjury, drug dealing and the improper disclosure of confidential information have been examined. [The Western Australian Police Service] has been ineffective in monitoring those events and modifying its procedures to deal with that conduct and to prevent its repetition. The fact that there remain in WAPS a number of officers who participated in this conduct, and who not only refused to admit it, but also uniformly denied it with vehemence, is a matter of concern.

In 2003, largely as a result of the findings of the Royal Commission, a permanent investigative Corruption and Crime Commission was established by the Government of Western Australia.

History of racism 
On 12 July 2018, in a NAIDOC Week address, Police Commissioner Chris Dawson formally acknowledged a "history of racism or 'unconscious bias and publicly apologised to Aboriginal people for past mistreatment, urging his officers to treat Aboriginal people the same as they would a person of another race or background.

Attorney-General for Western Australia, John Quigley, said in June 2020 that there was "systematic discrimination" against Indigenous Australians in the Western Australian justice system. Statistically, Indigenous people were far more likely to be stopped and questioned by police than non-Indigenous, more likely to be arrested if charged by police and less likely to get bail. Imprisonment of Indigenous people in WA was 4.1 per cent, compared with 2.6 nationally. The number of Indigenous adults going to prison, and young people being held in detention was still increasing, although the rate of imprisonment had slowed. He said that legislative reforms were being planned. WA has a higher number of Aboriginal deaths in custody since 1991 than any other state or territory.

Investigative abuses

Corryn Rayney murder investigation 
In his judgment of a murder trial initiated in 2012 following the death of Corryn Rayney, Justice Brian Martin handed down a "not guilty" verdict and was critical of some police actions, stating that "there were instances of unacceptable conduct by some investigators ranging from inappropriate to reprehensible". He added that he had found "no evidence that lines of inquiry were not properly investigated". Some five years before charges were laid, the senior sergeant in charge of the investigation had publicly named Lloyd Rayney as the force's "only suspect" and the "primary person of interest". At the trial, which extended over three months, the judge found that "the State case is bereft of any evidence [establishing] a crime scene". He concluded "The case for the State is beset by improbabilities and uncertainties. Crucial evidence is lacking and the absence of evidence tells strongly against the State. Endeavours by the State to fill critical gaps and explain away improbabilities are primarily no more than speculation without foundation in the evidence." These findings were substantially upheld and vindicated by an appeal bench of three judges who unanimously dismissed the prosecutors' appeal, and upheld the trial judge's analysis and verdict.

An April 2014 report of the Western Australian Crimes and Corruption Commission cleared two police officers of any serious misconduct in the Corryn Rayney murder investigation. Their behaviour in threatening a female lawyer had been described as ranging from "inappropriate to reprehensible" by the trial judge. A second matter reviewed by the CCC related to "attempts by a third officer to encourage an independent pathologist involved in the case to change a report to better fit police evidence. That officer was found to have acted unreasonably." In September 2014, lawyer and former state governor Malcolm McCusker supported calls for an independent review, and also a Corruption and Crime Commission investigation of "claims that police manufactured evidence to incriminate...Lloyd Rayney".

As of 2017, the senior investigating officer in the Rayney murder case continued to regard Lloyd Rayney as "the prime and only suspect" despite Rayney's comprehensive exoneration by the courts. A defamation action brought by Rayney resulted in a record compensation award of over $2.6 million and legal costs of over $10 million.

Wrongful prosecutions 
Justice Martin's criticism of the Corryn Rayney investigation followed the exposure of a number of notorious cases of wrongful prosecution by Western Australia Police, including those of John Button, Darryl Beamish, the Mickelberg brothers and Andrew Mallard, resulting in reversal of long-standing convictions and large compensation payouts by government. In the case of Mallard, who spent 12 years in prison after an unjust conviction, a former WA assistant commissioner has concluded "Mallard is a very clear example of how police and prosecutorial misconduct can lead to a wrongful conviction and a miscarriage of justice...It is also another clear example of the difficulties in holding people to account."

Scott Austic
A clemency petition drafted by the eminent barrister Malcolm McCusker, and lodged with the Western Australian attorney-general in 2012, alleged that key evidence was planted, withheld and misrepresented in police investigations leading to a 2009 murder trial in which Scott Douglas Austic was found guilty and sentenced to a minimum 25-year jail term. After two successive attorneys-general declined to act on the petition, a fresh petition for clemency was lodged in March 2018 with a more receptive Attorney-General John Quigley, who also proposed legislation to allow people convicted of crimes to apply directly to the Court of Appeal. Quigley, formerly an honorary life member of the Police Union of Western Australia, has subsequently become a fierce critic of the WA Police culture and hierarchy.
After spending over a decade in jail, in May 2020 Scott Austic won an appeal against his conviction, was acquitted at a re-trial in November 2020. and is seeking compensation. , there have been no reported charges against police officers for perverting the course of justice.

Aboriginal man, Gene Gibson 
On 12 April 2017, Gene Gibson, an illiterate and mentally impaired 25-year-old Aboriginal man, was released from prison by an appeals court after unjustly serving five years of a manslaughter sentence. Gibson, who was 20 when charged with a two-year-old unsolved murder, was interviewed for many hours by two junior detectives without benefit of an interpreter or legal counsel, which ultimately led to a fake confession and wrongful conviction. Police Commissioner Karl O'Callaghan apologised for the investigative failure, but disclosed the three officers "had not accepted blame and would now face an internal disciplinary process".

Taser misuse incidents

Academic and wife and subsequent legal case 
In November 2008, an academic and his wife were tasered by police during an arrest outside a hotel in Fremantle and charged with obstructing a public officer.  In 2010 both charges were dismissed, after a magistrate described evidence given by one of the arresting police officers as "extremely evasive", "imprecise" and "unconvincing".  The couple's lengthy requests for investigation and retribution were unsuccessful, so in December 2016, they successfully sued and were awarded over $1 million in damages.

"Hooliganism" in police station 
Two Rockingham senior police officers were sacked in 2010 for using Tasers on their colleagues during hooligan-style antics at the station over 18 months.

Repeated tasering of Aboriginal man on two occasions 
In September 2010 a video was released of an event in which numerous police officers tasered a man 14 times inside a WA police station. The incident, which occurred in August 2008, sparked worldwide publicity and renewed debate about the inclusion of tasers in the police force and officers' excessive use of it. In April 2012, the state's Corruption and Crime Commission made several misconduct findings, recommended charges and said the policemen used "undue and excessive" force. The same man had also been tasered 11 times on 6 September 2008 by Emergency Support Group officers from the Department of Corrective Services while being removed from a cell in the Perth Watch House. In April 2013, it was reported that two senior officers were to be tried on criminal charges over the first incident. At a hearing on 22 January 2014, the two officers were fined and given suspended jail terms for unlawful assault.

Person seated in vehicle 
In March 2018, Grantley James Keenan, a senior constable with WA Police was suspended for tasering a man seated at the wheel of his vehicle in Fremantle. The tasering had been deemed lawful by a police internal investigation but was described as unlawful, unreasonable and oppressive in a report by the state's Corruption and Crime Commission. He was found guilty of two counts of common assault against the motorist and received an eight-month suspended prison sentence. Keenan was also ordered to pay a fine of $1,500 and court costs of almost $16,500.

Charges brought against serving police officers

2010

"Clothes-line" attack on motorbike riders 

In 2010, a senior constable in WA Police's "specialist enforcement and operations team" was charged with two counts of "assault causing bodily harm" and one of "causing bodily harm by an action or lack of action", after allegedly tying a rope across a Karawara path known to be used by motorbike riders.  Two boys, aged 15 and 16, were knocked off their bikes with a police spokesman describing their injuries as "believed to be serious, but not life-threatening".  The officer was due to attend Perth magistrates court on 4 January 2011.

2019

Police officer twice convicted of assault 
In February 2019, ABC news reported that WA police senior constable, Nathan Robert Trenberth was filmed repeatedly punching a 20-year-old man in the head during the Sky Show celebrations.  The magistrate described his use of force as "unreasonable" and convicted the officer of assault and fined him $1,500.  Trenberth had a second conviction for assault in relation to an arrest of a man at a 2006 Australia Day fireworks display.

See also
 Constable Care
 Western Australia Police Pipe Band
 Crime in Western Australia
 Police misconduct
 Perth Mint Swindle
 Andrew Mallard
 John Quigley

References

Footnotes

Sources

 Western Australia Police Force Annual Reports (Series from 2001)
 Western Australian Year Book 1974.
 Lieutenant-Governor Stirling's Proclamation of the Colony, 18 June 1829 (UK)
 Western Australia Police Service 2003
 WA Parliamentary Select Committee on the Western Australian Police Service Interim Report, June 1996
 Episodes in Western Australia's Policing History (1834-2002) on official website

External links
 Western Australia Police Force website
 Crime Stoppers WA
 Neighbourhood Watch
 Office of Crime Prevention

 
Police aviation
Law enforcement agencies of Western Australia
1834 establishments in Australia
Emergency services in Western Australia